Maggiore means "major" or "large" in Italian. It can refer to:

Locations and places
 Lake Maggiore, located at northwestern Italy and southern Switzerland
 Isola Maggiore, the second largest island on Lake Trasimeno, Umbria, Italy
 Fontana Maggiore, a fountain in Perugia, Italy
 Porta Maggiore Basilica, an underground basilica discovered in 1917 near Porta Maggiore in Rome, Italy
 Porta Maggiore, Bologna (now Porta Mazzini), the main eastern portal of the former medieval walls of the city of Bologna, Italy
 Portomaggiore, a town in Ferrara, Italy
 Monte Maggiori or Učka, a mountain range in Croatia

People
 Christine Maggiore (1956—2008), HIV-positive activist who promoted the view that HIV is not the cause of AIDS
 Gianluca Maggiore (born 1985), Italian former racing cyclist
 Giulio Maggiore (born 1998), Italian football player
 Hervé Della Maggiore (born 1972), French former football midfielder

Other uses
 Maggiore (grape), an Italian wine grape also known as Verdicchio
 Major in music
 Major, the military rank